Waistline may refer to:

 Waist, the narrow point of the human body between the ribcage and hips
 Waistline (clothing), the line of demarcation between the upper and lower portions of a garment